The Reyran is a torrent of the Var department in Provence-Alpes-Côte d'Azur, France and a tributary of the Argens. It is an ephemeral stream, 26.8 km long, which originates in Bagnols-en-Forêt in the Var, 12 km from Fréjus.
The Reyran flows only three months a year and can be dry the rest of the year. Its flow is very irregular. The annual rate is 22.70 million m3 and once every 30 years reaches to only 15.75 million m3. The rate is highest during the months of December, January and April. The flow rate is sometimes zero during July and August. During the summer months, the river bed may present a series of isolated ponds that decrease in size by the day. The bed of the Reyran is made of coarse sand and gravel up to 30–40 cm. Their lithology is that of surrounding rocks: sandstone, gneiss, pegmatite, volcanic rocks.

Fréjus
The Reyran is piped in through the city of Fréjus. A concrete canal was built after the Malpasset Dam failure. These are preventive measures of the city against flood risks. The Reyran does not cause flood plain, as Argens, but rather exceptional torrential floods and urban run-offs as the Garonne and Valescure to the neighboring town of Saint-Raphael. A flood of this type occurred in 2012 and destroyed the concrete ford located just downstream from the highway bridge, close to the ancient hamlet of Malpasset devastated in 1959.

The Frejus runs north to south and empties into the Argens at the Naval Air Base of Frejus-Saint Raphael.

References

Rivers of France
Rivers of Provence-Alpes-Côte d'Azur
Rivers of Var (department)